is a Japanese light novel series written by Nana Mikoshiba and illustrated by Riko Korie. It has been published online via the user-generated novel publishing website Shōsetsuka ni Narō since October 2019. It was later acquired by Kodansha, who has released the series since July 2020 under their Kodansha Ranobe Bunko imprint.

A manga adaptation illustrated by Norihito Sasaki has been serialized in Kodansha's Magazine Pocket website and app since June 2020. An anime television series adaptation by Cloud Hearts premiered in January 2023.

Premise
After winning a terrible war, Iceblade Sorcerer Ray White, decides to enroll in Arnold Academy, but in the guise of a commoner, causing those with higher class upbringings to look down on him. Despite this, he manages to make quick friends and must solve a conspiracy that plagues the school.

Characters

Media

Light novels
Written by Nana Mikoshiba, The Iceblade Sorcerer Shall Rule the World began publication in the user-generated novel publishing website Shōsetsuka ni Narō on October 25, 2019. The series was later acquired by Kodansha, who began publishing the novels with illustrations by Riko Korie on July 2, 2020 under their Kodansha Ranobe Bunko imprint. As of December 2022, seven volumes have been released.

Manga
A manga adaptation illustrated by Norihito Sasaki began serialization in Kodansha's Magazine Pocket website and app on June 24, 2020. As of January 2023, eleven tankōbon volumes have been released. In North America, Kodansha USA has licensed the manga for an English digital release.

Anime
An anime television series adaptation was announced on April 28, 2022. The series is produced by Cloud Hearts, with supervision from Yokohama Animation Laboratory, and is directed by Masahiro Takata, who will also supervise the scripts and direct the sound. Makoto Shimojima is handling the character designs, while Tatsuhiko Saiki and Natsumi Tabuchi are composing the music. It premiered on January 6, 2023, on TBS and BS11. Crunchyroll licensed the series.

Notes

References

External links
  at Shōsetsuka ni Narō 
  
  
 

2020 Japanese novels
2023 anime television series debuts
Adventure anime and manga
Anime and manga based on light novels
Cloud Hearts
Crunchyroll anime
Fantasy anime and manga
Japanese fantasy novels
Japanese webcomics
Kodansha books
Kodansha manga
Kodansha Ranobe Bunko
Light novels
Light novels first published online
Shōnen manga
Shōsetsuka ni Narō
TBS Television (Japan) original programming
Webcomics in print